Sidney is an unincorporated community  in Pike County, Kentucky, United States, nestled at the intersection of KY 486 and KY 3220.  Although Sidney is unincorporated, it has its own volunteer fire department (Big Creek Fire Department). There are also several coal mining operations that are still in use.

Country Singer-Songwriter Stephen Cochran is from this area.

References 

Unincorporated communities in Pike County, Kentucky
Unincorporated communities in Kentucky